Nisi is a village and a community in the municipal unit of Vouprasia, Elis, Greece. It is situated in low hills, 4 km south of Neapoli, 8 km northwest of Aetorrachi, 7 km southeast of Varda and 35 km north of Pyrgos. In 2001 Nisi had a population of 203 for the village and 352 for the community, which includes the small villages Agia Marina, Agios Athanasios, Karavoulaiika and Kremmydi.

Population

External links
 Nisi on the GTP Travel Pages

See also

List of settlements in Elis

References

Populated places in Elis
Vouprasia